"Light My Body Up" is a song by French music producer David Guetta featuring vocals from rappers Nicki Minaj and Lil Wayne, released on March 23, 2017.

Background and release 
After collaborating on "Where Them Girls At", "Turn Me On" and "Hey Mama", "Light My Body Up" marks the fourth time David Guetta and Nicki Minaj have worked together on a song. Released on March 23, 2017, the song carries a theme of fire throughout the piece and includes guest vocals by rapper Lil Wayne, his first time collaborating with Guetta since "I Can Only Imagine".

According to Minaj, earlier versions of the song only had her vocals and did not include her rap verse. The first verse was added later after Guetta played a demo of the song to his daughter Angie who remarked: "Why isn't Nicki rapping on it too?" the music was produced between the 12th until May 15, 2016  Wayne's verse was also added later after Minaj surprised the French DJ with it.

Composition 
"Light My Body Up" is written in the key of F minor with a tempo of 146 beats per minute.

Music video 
A lyric video was released on 23 March 2017 through David Guetta's YouTube channel.

The song's official music video was released on 5 May 2017. The video begins with a long shot of Miami Beach, Florida at night, then introduces the featured artists David Guetta, Nicki Minaj, Lil Wayne as well as director Benny Boom.

Credits and personnel 

 Songwriting: David Guetta, Julien Martinez, Ester Dean, Onika Maraj, Nick van de Wall, Dwayne Carter, Kirill Slepukha, Danil Shilovskii
 Production: David Guetta, Julien "Drek" Martinez
 Vocal production: Nick Cooper
 Assistant: Nick Valentin, Brian Judd
 Recording: Aubry "Big Juice" Delaine, Manny Galvez; Cruise Control Studios, Amsterdam, Netherlands and Hit Factory Criteria, Miami, Florida
 Audio mixing: Daddy's Groove; Test Pressing Studio's, Naples, Italy
 Audio mastering: Daddy's Groove; Test Pressing Studio's, Naples, Italy

Charts

Weekly charts

Year-end charts

References 

2017 songs
2017 singles
David Guetta songs
Nicki Minaj songs
Lil Wayne songs
Songs written by David Guetta
Songs written by Giorgio Tuinfort
Songs written by Ester Dean
Songs written by Nicki Minaj
Songs written by Afrojack
Songs written by Lil Wayne
Song recordings produced by David Guetta